Leon Willem Evert "Léon" de Jong (born 31 August 1982 in Gouda) is a Dutch politician and singer and a former musician and salesman. As a member of the Party for Freedom (Partij voor de Vrijheid) he was an MP from 17 June 2010 to 19 September 2012 and again from 2017. He focused on matters of social affairs, employment and infrastructure.

De Jong worked in retail and finance and was part of the pop rock singing duo In Front, before entering into politics in 2010.

De Jong currently leads the Party for Freedom in the city council of The Hague, where he serves as council member.

Personal 
De Jong has a relationship with PVV parliament member Fleur Agema with whom he has a daughter.

References 
  Parlement.com biography

1982 births
Living people
Dutch pop singers
Dutch rock singers
Members of the House of Representatives (Netherlands)
Party for Freedom politicians
People from Gouda, South Holland
21st-century Dutch politicians
Dutch Zionists
21st-century Dutch male singers
21st-century Dutch singers
20th-century Dutch people